Andrej Kamendy (born 25 October 1983, in Hlohovec) is a Slovak football midfielder who currently plays for the 2. liga club MFK Lokomotíva Zvolen.

Inter Bratislava
He made his Corgoň Liga debut for FK Inter Bratislava on 19 August 2006, against FC Nitra, the match ended 0 - 0 draw.

External links
 
 Eurofotbal profile

References

1979 births
Living people
Slovak footballers
Association football midfielders
FK Inter Bratislava players
MŠK Novohrad Lučenec players
TJ Baník Ružiná players
MFK Lokomotíva Zvolen players
Slovak Super Liga players
Expatriate footballers in the Czech Republic
People from Hlohovec
Sportspeople from the Trnava Region